Ole Martin Årst (born 19 July 1974) is a Norwegian retired professional footballer who played as a forward. He is a former top scorer in both Belgium's and Norway's top leagues.

Club career
Born in Bergen, Årst grew up in Tromsø. He made his professional debut for Tromsø IL on 22 April 1995 against Hamarkameratene at Briskeby stadion. He then moved to K.A.A. Gent in Belgium and became as a top goalscorer in 2000 with 30 goals. Then Standard Liège signed him for NOK 24 million. He returned to Tromsø IL in the summer of 2003 for NOK 5 million.

Årst became the top scorer in the Tippeligaen 2005, with 16 goals. After a hat-trick against IK Start on 2 October 2005 Årst was ranked as the top league scorer of all times in Tromsø IL with 51 goals. On 9 July 2007, he transferred to IK Start.

Start went down that season, but as Start won a direct promotion in 2008, Årst did not participate in any games due to a serious injury. The same injury limited him to only two games in the 2009 season.

He announced his retirement in October 2009.

He made a comeback for the club in a friendly match in early 2010. He then signed a contract for the duration of 2010, with possibilities of renewal.

Årst signed a one-year deal with Tromsø IL ahead of the 2012 Tippeligaen season. This was his third spell at the club.

International career
Årst made his debut for the Norway national team in a January 2000 friendly match against Iceland and went on to earn 22 caps, scoring two goals.

Career statistics

Honours
Tromsø
 Norwegian Cup: 1996

Individual
 Belgian First Division top scorer: 2000
 Tippeligaen top scorer: 2005
 Kniksen award: striker of the year: 2005

References

1974 births
Living people
Sportspeople from Tromsø
Norwegian footballers
Association football forwards
Norway international footballers
Norway under-21 international footballers
Belgian Pro League players
Eliteserien players
Norwegian First Division players
Tromsø IL players
R.S.C. Anderlecht players
K.A.A. Gent players
Standard Liège players
IK Start players
Kniksen Award winners
Norwegian expatriate footballers
Norwegian expatriate sportspeople in Belgium
Expatriate footballers in Belgium